The Farnley Academy is a secondary school with serving the Farnley, New Farnley and Wortley wards of Leeds, West Yorkshire, England. Mr Stokes is the principal at the Academy

The Farnley Academy is built on the site of Cow Close Secondary School which became Harrington High, then Farnley Park High and then Farnley Park Maths and Computing College. The school was converted to academy status in 2012 and was renamed The Farnley Academy. The first phase of the school's £23 million Building Schools for the Future programme was completed in February 2012 with the opening of the Tomlinson Building. The refurbished Bronte Building* opened in September 2012 with the whole project completed in November 2012.

Today, the school forms part of the Gorse Academies Trust which also includes The Morley Academy, The Ruth Gorse Academy and the Elliott Hudson College. The Farnley Academy's GCSE results improved from 32% 5+ A*-C EM in 2009 to 73% 5+ A*-C in 2014.

The Farnley Academy is one of the few schools in the country to share a site with a centre for children with complex needs, the West SILC.

References

External links 
School Homepage

Secondary schools in Leeds
Academies in Leeds
Educational institutions established in 1992
1992 establishments in England
Farnley, Leeds